Florence Peshine Eagleton (April 16, 1870 – November 22, 1953) was a leader in the woman suffrage movement and advocated women's higher education. She was one of the first women to serve as a Trustee of Rutgers University. She willed more than $1,000,000 to establish the Wells Phillips Eagleton and Florence Peshine Eagleton Foundation, now the Eagleton Institute of Politics at Rutgers University.

Biography
She was born in Newark, New Jersey to Elizabeth Mary Jellip and Francis Stratford Peshine. Francis was a shoe dealer. They were reasonably affluent as is borne out by the fact that in 1880 they had three live-in servants. She married a man twice her age, and that marriage ended in divorce. In 1913 she married Wells Phillips Eagleton (1865-1946), a neurosurgeon. She was a trustee of the Newark Museum, a vice president of the Travelers Aid Society, and a life member of the New Jersey Historical Society. She died on November 22, 1956.

References

External links
Eagleton Institute of Politics
Rutgers: Florence Peshine Eagleton

Rutgers University people
1870 births
1956 deaths
People from Newark, New Jersey